Dasypolia templi, the brindled ochre, is a moth of the family Noctuidae. The species was first described by Carl Peter Thunberg in 1792. It is found in northern Europe up to central Siberia and more to the south in mountainous areas.

Description

The length of the forewings is 18–23 mm. Forewing pale yellow grey in the male, simply pale grey in the female, densely dusted with darker: the lines diffusely darker still, outwardly edged with pale ground colour; median area often darker, the reniform, and sometimes the orbicular, showing paler; submarginal line pale, waved; fringe chequered, grey and yellowish; hindwing a little paler, with cellspot, outer, and sometimes a submarginal line greyer; — ab. alpina Ruehl. is an alpine form, with the ground colour more bluish grey, the stigmata picked out with chalk white, and the outer line of hindwing more strongly marked.

Biology
Larva yellowish grey, tinged dorsally with red; when fully grown, they are the peachy tan, with large tubercles; head, thoracic, and anal plates brown. The larvae feed on Aegopodium podagraria, Angelica sylvestris, Angelica archangelica v. litoralis, Levisticum officinale, Heracleum sphondylium and Heracleum laciniatum.

Subspecies
The following subspecies are recognised:
Dasypolia templi alpina
Dasypolia templi variegata
Dasypolia templi banghaasi
Dasypolia templi calobrolucana
Dasypolia templi powelli
Dasypolia templi koenigi
Dasypolia templi vecchimontium
Dasypolia templi anatolica
Dasypolia templi armeniaca
Dasypolia templi hortensis
Dasypolia templi centralasiae
Dasypolia templi dushaki

References

External links

Brindled ochre at UKMoths

Fauna Europaea
Lepiforum e.V.
De Vlinderstichting 

Cuculliinae
Moths of Europe
Moths of Asia
Moths described in 1792
Taxa named by Carl Peter Thunberg